Pylyp Morachevskyi (1806–1879) was a Ukrainian romantic poet, and translator of the New Testament into Ukrainian. He sometimes wrote under the pseudonym Khvylymon Haluzenko (Хвилимон Галузенко).

He was born in the village of Shestovytsya in Chernihiv Oblast to a poor noble family, and studied at the local school in Chernihiv, then later at the University of Kharkiv. He began to work on Ukrainian language texts in the 1850s:

In 1859 he retired with his wife, three sons and two daughters to the village of Shnakivtsi in Nizhynsky County. In the 1860s he began his Bible translations into Ukrainian starting with the Gospels, completed in November 1861, then Acts of the Apostles Revelation and Psalms. He also wrote a Ukrainian "Sacred History" for elementary schools. However the Russian authorities did not permit the publication of his Ukrainian New Testament portions until 27 years after his death in 1906 in Nizhyn.

Works
His most famous poems include:
 Chumaks, or Ukraine in 1768 «Чумаки, або Україна з 1768 року»
 To a Chumak «До чумака, або Війна янгло-хранцузо-турецька»

References

1806 births
1879 deaths
Ukrainian poets
Translators of the Bible into Ukrainian
National University of Kharkiv alumni
19th-century translators
19th-century poets